International scientific vocabulary (ISV) comprises scientific and specialized words whose language of origin may or may not be certain, but which are in current use in several modern languages (that is, translingually, whether in naturalized, loanword, or calque forms). 

The name "international scientific vocabulary" was first used by Philip Gove in Webster's Third New International Dictionary (1961). As noted by David Crystal, science is an especially productive field for new coinages. It is also especially predisposed to immediate translingual sharing of words owing to its very nature: scientists working in many countries and languages, reading each other's latest articles in scientific journals (via foreign language skills, translation help, or both), and eager to apply any reported advances to their own context.

Instances
According to Webster's Third, "some ISV words (like haploid) have been created by taking a word with a rather general and simple meaning from one of the languages of antiquity, usually Latin and Greek, and conferring upon it a very specific and complicated meaning for the purposes of modern scientific discourse." An ISV word is typically a classical compound or a derivative which "gets only its raw materials, so to speak, from antiquity." Its morphology may vary across languages.

The online version of Webster's Third New International Dictionary, Unabridged (Merriam-Webster, 2002) adds that the ISV "consists of words or other linguistic forms current in two or more languages" that "differ from New Latin in being adapted to the structure of the individual languages in which they appear."  In other words, ISV terms are often made with Greek, Latin, or other combining forms, but each language pronounces the resulting neo-lexemes within its own phonemic "comfort zone", and makes morphological connections using its normal morphological system. In this respect, ISV can be viewed as heavily borrowing loanwords from New Latin.

McArthur characterizes ISV words and morphemes as "translinguistic", explaining that they operate "in many languages that serve as mediums for education, culture, science, and technology." Besides European languages, such as Russian, Swedish, English, and Spanish, ISV lexical items also function in Japanese, Malay, Philippine languages, and other Asian languages. According to McArthur, no other set of words and morphemes is so international. 

It is not always practically relevant, to any concerns except philology and the history of science, which language any particular ISV term first appeared in, as its cognate naturalized counterparts in other languages are effectively coeval with it for most practical scientific purposes, as well as being self-evidently equivalent in surface analysis. This characteristic is corollary to the very nature of science: it is predisposed to immediate translingual sharing of words, as scientists, working in many countries and languages, are perennially reading each other's latest articles in scientific journals (via foreign language skills, translation help, or both), and eager to apply any reported advances to their own context. This theme applies even regardless of whether each instance of scientific exchange is openly collaborative (as in open science) or is driven by espionage or industrial espionage (as for example regarding weapons systems development).

The ISV is one of the concepts behind the development and standardization of the constructed language called Interlingua. Scientific and medical terms in Interlingua are largely of Greco-Latin origin, but, like most Interlingua words, they appear in a wide range of languages. Interlingua's vocabulary is established using a group of control languages selected as they radiate words into, and absorb words from, a large number of other languages. A prototyping technique then selects the most recent common ancestor of each eligible Interlingua word or affix. The word or affix takes a contemporary form based on the control languages. This procedure is meant to give Interlingua the most generally international vocabulary possible.

Words and word roots that have different meanings from those in the original languages
This is a list of scientific words and word roots which have different meanings from those in the original languages.

Words and word roots that have one meaning from Latin and another meaning from Greek
This is a list of scientific words and word roots which have one meaning from Latin and another meaning from Greek.

Other words and word roots with two meanings
This is a list of other scientific words and word roots which have two meanings.

Other differences
Another difference between scientific terms and classical Latin and Greek is that many compounded scientific terms do not elide the inflection vowel at the end of a root before another root or prefix that starts with a vowel, e.g. gastroenteritis; but elision happens in gastrectomy (not *gastroectomy).

The Greek word  = "monster" is usually used to mean "monster (abnormal)" (e.g. teratology, teratogen), but some biological names use it to mean "monster (enormous)" (e.g. the extinct animals Teratornis (a condor with a 12-foot wingspan) and Terataspis (a trilobite 2 feet long)).

Haplology
A feature affecting clarity in seeing a scientific word's components is haplology, i.e. removing one of two identical or similar syllables that meet at the junction point of a compound word. Examples are:
Hapalemur = hapalo- (Greek , "gentle") + lemur

See also
Binomial nomenclature
Classical compound
English words of Greek origin
Greek and Latin roots in English
Hybrid word
Internationalism (linguistics)
Latinization (literature)
Lexicography
Language-for-specific-purposes dictionary (LSP dictionary)
Medical dictionary
Medical terminology
Scientific Latin
Scientific terminology
Scientific notation
Systematic name
Terminology

Lists
List of abbreviations used in medical prescriptions
List of Latin abbreviations
List of Latin and Greek words commonly used in systematic names
List of medical roots, suffixes and prefixes
List of Germanic and Latinate equivalents
List of Latin words with English derivatives
List of Greek and Latin roots in English

References

External links
Dictionary of Botanical Epithets
List of Latin Words with Derivatives to English
Concise Oxford Companion to the English Language 1998 entry on International Scientific Vocabulary

Lexis (linguistics)
Interlingua